Novovaskino is a rural locality (a village) in Mishkinsky Selsoviet, Mishkinsky District, Bashkortostan, Russia. The population was 172 as of 2010. There are 7 streets.

Geography 
Novovaskino  is located 5 km east of Mishkino (the district's administrative centre) by road. Mishkino is the nearest rural locality.

References 

Rural localities in Mishkinsky District